Georgios "George" Andreadis (born 30 September 1941 in Attiki, Athens) is a sailor from Greece, who represented his country at two Olympic Games. The first time was the 1968 Summer Olympics in Acapulco, Mexico as helmsman in the Flying Dutchman. With crew Stavros Psarrakis they took the 22nd place. The second appearance was the 1976 Summer Olympics in Kingston, Ontario, Canada as helmsman in the Soling. With crew members Georgios Perrakis and Konstantinos Lymberakis they took the 14th place. 

Andreadis fulfilled several roles within World Sailing one of them is the role of Vice President. In 2010, he was a recipient of the Silver Olympic Order.

References

Sources
 

Living people
1941 births
Greek male sailors (sport)
Flying Dutchman class sailors
Sailors at the 1968 Summer Olympics – Flying Dutchman
Sailors at the 1976 Summer Olympics – Soling
Olympic sailors of Greece
Recipients of the Olympic Order
Sailors (sport) from Athens